The ' All Pakistan Federation of United Trade Unions (APFUTU) is a national trade union centre in Pakistan. It was formed in 1992 and got registration from National Industrial Relations Commission. APFUTU has a membership of 4,02,723.The APFUTU-based industrial city of Gujrat (Punjab).

Main affiliated trade unions  
APFUTU affiliated union Pak Employees Union,( Municipal and Wood Working )
Punjab Local Transport Union,
Labour Union TMAs, Pak Employees Union,
TMA, Gujrat,
Pakistan Brick Kiln Labour Union,
Punjab Federation of Brick Kiln Labour Unions,
Punjab Federation of Agricultural Workshops,
DESCON Engineering Labour Union,
Pakistan Power Looms Employees Union,
Pakistan Civil Transport Workers Union,
Cab Federation of Transport Punjab,
Pakistan State Life Insurance Staff Union,
Anwar Industries Workers Union,
Amin Coal Mines Workers Union,
Jamhoori Workers Union,
WASA,
FDA, Fasilabad Workers & Staff Trade Union
Crescent Sugar Mills Employees Union, 
Agricultural Eng. Housing & Physical Planning National Employees Union,
State Life Insurance Staff Union
Descon Engineering Mazdoor Union,
Dharki
ICI Employees Union (CBA) Karachi.
Pak Employees Union Wood Working Center
Labour & Staff Union(CBA) Shahtaj Sugar MillsHussnain Textile Mills Workers Union
Labour Union Zahid Garments Industry
Pak Labour Union, Azhar Garments
Pak Employees Union, Fazal Textile Mills
Teachers and Education Association
Union of Journalists, Pakistan
Culturel Workers Union
Sports Workers Forum

References

Trade unions in Pakistan
Trade unions established in 1992